Modern Greek studies refers to an academic discipline of the humanities whose object is the linguistic, literary, cultural as well as geographical and folkloristic exploration and teaching of Greek in the world (Greece, Cyprus and the Greek diaspora) in the Modern Age and present time.

References

 
Philology
Modern Greek language